Tresor Mbuyu (born 16 October 1996) is a Congolese footballer who plays as a forward for Charlotte Independence in the USL Championship.

Career
Mbuyu signed with USL League One side Orlando City B in 2019.

Mbuyu joined USL Championship side Charlotte Independence in 2020. On February 16, 2022, Charlotte announced that Mbuyu had re-signed, staying with the team as they transitioned to USL League One. On May 11, 2022, Mbuyu was named USL League One player of the month for April. He returned to the team for the 2023 season.

Personal life
Mbuyu moved to the United States from the Democratic Republic of the Congo at the age of 13, settling in Charlotte and attending Garinger High School.

References

External links
 
 Tresor Mbuyu at Liberty University Athletics

1996 births
Living people
American soccer players
Association football midfielders
Liberty Flames men's soccer players
Charlotte Eagles players
North Carolina FC U23 players
Orlando City B players
Charlotte Independence players
Soccer players from Charlotte, North Carolina
USL League One players
USL League Two players
USL Championship players